The Skeleton Key is a 2005 American Southern Gothic supernatural horror film directed by Iain Softley, written by Ehren Kruger, and starring Kate Hudson, Gena Rowlands, John Hurt, Peter Sarsgaard, and Joy Bryant. The narrative follows a New Orleans hospice nurse who begins a job at a Terrebonne Parish plantation home, and becomes entangled in a supernatural mystery involving the house, its former inhabitants, and Hoodoo rituals and spells that took place there.

Plot 
Caroline Ellis, a hospice aide, quits her position at a nursing home and is hired as the caretaker of an isolated plantation house in Terrebonne Parish, Louisiana. The aging matron of the house, Violet Devereaux, needs help looking after her husband Benjamin, who was mostly paralyzed by an apparent stroke. At the insistence of the family's estate lawyer, Luke Marshall, Caroline accepts the position.

After Ben attempts to escape his room during a storm, Caroline investigates the house's attic, where Violet said Ben suffered his stroke; she uses a skeleton key which Violet gave her. She discovers a secret room filled with ritual paraphernalia. Caroline confronts Violet, who reveals that the room used to belong to two African American servants who were employed at the house 90 years before. The servants, Mama Cecile and Papa Justify, were renowned hoodoo practitioners; they were lynched after conducting a ritual with the owners' two children, from whom Violet and Ben later bought the house. Violet tells Caroline that they keep no mirrors in the house because they see reflections of Cecile and Justify in them. Caroline borrows a phonograph record from the attic: Conjure of Sacrifice, a recording of Papa Justify reciting a hoodoo ritual.

Caroline surmises that Ben's stroke was caused by hoodoo, but believes that his paralytic state is a nocebo effect induced by his own belief, rather than something supernatural. Taking advice from her friend Jill, Caroline visits a hidden hoodoo shop in a nearby laundromat, where a hoodoo woman gives her tools and instructions to cure Ben. After she conducts the ritual, Ben regains some ability to move and speak and he begs Caroline to get him away from Violet.

Caroline tells Luke she is suspicious of Violet, but he remains skeptical. They travel to a gas station that Caroline previously noted was lined with brick dust, which she was told is a hoodoo defense; supposedly, no one who means one harm can pass a line of brick dust. She asks one of the proprietors, a blind woman, about the Conjure of Sacrifice, which she learns is a spell wherein the caster steals the remaining years of life from the victim. Increasingly convinced of hoodoo's authenticity, Caroline fears that Violet will soon cast the spell on Ben.

Caroline discovers that Violet is unable to pass a line of brick dust laid across one of the house's doorways, confirming her suspicions. She incapacitates Violet and attempts to escape the house with Ben, but the front gate is chained shut. Caroline hides Ben on the property and enters Luke's office for help. Luke, revealed to be Violet's accomplice, brings Caroline back to the house. Caroline escapes, gets into a fight with Violet, and violently pushes her down the stairs, breaking her legs in the process. With strategic use of brick dust, Caroline flees to the attic, calls 9-1-1 and Jill for help, and casts what she believes is a protective spell. Violet, having caught up with her, reveals she actually trapped herself inside a protective circle. Violet pushes a full-length mirror at Caroline, which reflects the original owner's daughter, then Violet, and lastly Mama Cecile. A recording of the Conjure of Sacrifice plays, and the two switch bodies.

Violet (revealed to be Mama Cecile, who had been occupying Violet's body through the Conjure) wakes up in Caroline's body, and force-feeds Caroline (now in Violet's body) a potion that induces a stroke-like paralytic state like Ben's. Luke (actually Papa Justify) arrives upstairs, revealing that Mama Cecile and Papa Justify have been conducting the Conjure of Sacrifice on new people since their supposed deaths; they had swapped places with the two children just before the lynching. Because hoodoo is supposedly only effective on those who believe in it, Cecile and Justify had to wait for Caroline to come to believe in hoodoo through her own investigation.

Emergency services arrive the next morning and take Caroline and Ben away, trapped in the paralyzed dying bodies; when Jill arrives, "Luke" tells her that the Devereauxes left the house to Caroline, ensuring that Cecile and Justify will continue to occupy the house.

Cast

Production
The Skeleton Key was filmed at the Felicity Plantation, located on the Mississippi River in Saint James Parish, Louisiana.

Release 
The Skeleton Key was released in the U.S. on August 12, 2005, after having received an earlier release date of July 29, 2005 in the United Kingdom. It grossed $92 million worldwide. In the U.S., it took in $16.1 million in its first weekend, reaching number 2 at the box office; the total US gross was $47.9 million.

Reception
Review aggregator Rotten Tomatoes reports that 38% of 149 surveyed critics gave the film a positive review; the average rating is 5.3/10.  The site's consensus reads: "Thanks to its creaky and formulaic script, The Skeleton Key is more mumbo-jumbo than hoodoo and more dull than scary." Metacritic rated it 47/100 based on 32 reviews.

Most of the reviews were mixed.  Roger Ebert's review wrote, "The Skeleton Key is one of those movies that explains too much while it is explaining too little, and leaves us with a surprise at the end that makes more sense the less we think about it. But the movie's mastery of technique makes up for a lot." The Guardians Peter Bradshaw awarded the film three out of five stars, noting: "It's a pretty thankless role for poor John Hurt, and there are some plot holes. But there's some shrewd satire of racism as the modern south's persistent, dirty little secret and screenwriter Ehren Kruger's third act conjures up a neat little shiver." Carina Chocano of the Los Angeles Times praised the film, calling it "tightly plotted and suspenseful enough to keep you guessing until the satisfying, unexpected end, which is worth suspending disbelief for," adding that "Hudson holds her own among impressive company. Not that Hurt has a whole lot to do other than grab an occasional wrist and recoil at his face in the mirror, and the usually measured Sarsgaard oversells it a bit, but Rowlands takes to the part like a fly to a shucked oyster."

Manohla Dargis of The New York Times criticized the film for its plot, describing it as "enjoyably inane," and also noted that the film "indulges in almost every conceivable regional and [Southern Gothic] genre cliché." USA Today wrote that the film "employs intriguing camera angles to heighten some of the suspense. It's too bad the movie goes over the top and falls apart in the last third." Stephanie Zacharek wrote in Salon: "Softley, working from a script by Ehren Kruger, puts so much care into layering moods and textures that he doesn't always scoot the action along as briskly as he should." In The Seattle Times, Moira McDonald wrote that the film is "occasionally scary but more often silly." In her review for The Austin Chronicle,  Marjorie Baumgarten wrote: "Director Softley again shows his gifts for creating atmospheric milieus...Yet the movie, overall, lacks tension and suspense. In Film Journal International, Edward Alter wrote that, "Iain Softley (K-Pax) and cinematographer Dan Mindel make the most of the setting," but concluded that the film was, "a paint-by-numbers supernatural thriller that's more interesting for its locations than for its story."

Connie Ogle in The Miami Herald wote "it's reasonably entertaining despite an abundance of haunted-house cliches, the usual inexplicable scary-movie behavior, and an almost-naked John Hurt."  Jennie Punter in The Globe and Mail called the film, "stylishly made but disappointingly lightweight." Writing for the Chicago Tribune, Jessica Reeves called the film "serviceable but ultimately disappointing". In his annual film guide, Leonard Maltin rated the film mediocre, stating that it was "well-produced and occasionally suspenseful, but populated by unpleasant characters and a story that moves too slowly."  In the annual DVD & Video Guide, Marsha Porter wrote, "A few good scares can't compensate for a sluggish pace, and the climactic twist comes as a surprise only because it doesn't make sense."

References

External links
 
 
 
 Interview with John Hurt
 Skeleton Key House-Outside Tour

2005 films
2005 horror films
2005 psychological thriller films
American psychological horror films
American supernatural thriller films
American supernatural horror films
Films scored by Edward Shearmur
Films set in country houses
Films set in New Orleans
Films shot in New Orleans
Hoodoo (spirituality)
Films with screenplays by Ehren Kruger
Southern Gothic films
Gothic horror films
Body swapping in films
Films about witchcraft
Universal Pictures films
Films about consciousness transfer
2000s supernatural films
Films directed by Iain Softley
2000s supernatural horror films
2000s English-language films
2000s American films